Pontefract Tanshelf railway station is the most central station in the town of Pontefract, West Yorkshire, England, and serves Pontefract Races, the racecourse located just down the street from the station. In the days of coal mining in the Pontefract area, the station served the needs of the local workforce with regular and frequent services timed for the beginning and the end of mining shifts. The station is the closest to the former Prince of Wales Colliery which closed in 2002. The station serves Beechnut Lane, the home ground of Pontefract Collieries F.C.

The first station on the site was opened in July 1871 as Tanshelf, being renamed Pontefract Tanshelf in 1936. It was closed in January 1967, when the passenger services were diverted away from the direct line to Wakefield Kirkgate (via , to serve Leeds via Castleford.

The other stations in the town are Pontefract Monkhill and Pontefract Baghill.

Unlike Pontefract Monkhill, both platforms of Tanshelf are wheelchair-accessible.

Services
On Sundays, there is a two-hourly service each way to the same destinations.

References

External links

Railway stations in Wakefield
DfT Category F2 stations
Former Lancashire and Yorkshire Railway stations
Railway stations in Great Britain opened in 1871
Railway stations in Great Britain closed in 1967
Reopened railway stations in Great Britain
Railway stations in Great Britain opened in 1992
Northern franchise railway stations
Beeching closures in England
Pontefract